The 1974 Northern Illinois Huskies football team represented Northern Illinois University as an independent during the 1974 NCAA Division I football season. Led by fourth-year head coach Jerry Ippoliti, the Huskies compiled a record of 4–7. Northern Illinois played home games at Huskie Stadium in DeKalb, Illinois. This was their last year as an independent team, as they moved to the Mid-American Conference the following season.

Schedule

References

Northern Illinois
Northern Illinois Huskies football seasons
Northern Illinois Huskies football